Austrian composer, Michael Haydn's Missa Hispanica or Missa a due cori, Klafsky I:17, MH 422, was presumably written for Spain, but there is no evidence of its ever having been performed there during Haydn's lifetime. The mass is scored for 2 oboes, 2 bassoons, 2 horns in low C, F and G, 2 trumpets in C, timpani, strings, basso continuo, SATB soloists, and two mixed choirs.

The mass setting is divided into the usual six movements:

 "Kyrie" Largo, C major, common time
—"Kyrie eleison" Allegro, 3/4
 "Gloria" Allegro con spirito, C major, common time

—"Qui tollis peccata mundi..." Adagio, F major, 3/4
—"Quoniam tu solus sanctus..." Vivace, C major, common time

 "Credo" Vivace, C major, 3/4
—"Et incarnatus est..." Adagio molto, G major, 2/4
—"Et resurrexit..." Allegro spiritoso, C major, 3/4

 "Sanctus" Andante con moto, C major, common time

 "Benedictus" Allegro moderato, C major, 3/4
—"Osanna..." Allegro, C major, common time
 "Agnus Dei" Largo, C major, 3/4
—"Dona nobis pacem..." Allegro con fuoco, C major, common time

The Austrian premiere was in Kremsmünster on June 24, 1792, a performance in Salzburg followed in 1796. When Empress Marie Therese visited Salzburg in 1805, she liked the music so much she wanted to have her own copy of the score.

Notes

References
 Rice (2003) John A. Cambridge Empress Marie Therese and music at the Viennese court, 1792 — 1807 Cambridge University Press
 Sherman (1966) Charles H. Vienna Messa à 2 cori. Vocal score Foreword  Haydn Mozart Presse

Compositions by Michael Haydn
Masses (music)
1792 compositions